The breakpoint cluster region protein (BCR) also known as renal carcinoma antigen NY-REN-26 is a protein that in humans is encoded by the BCR gene. BCR is one of the two genes in the BCR-ABL fusion protein, which is associated with the Philadelphia chromosome. Two transcript variants encoding different isoforms have been found for this gene.

Function 

Although the BCR-ABL fusion protein has been much studied, the function of the normal BCR gene product is still not clear. The protein has serine/threonine kinase activity and is a guanine nucleotide exchange factor for the Rho family of GTPases including RhoA.

Clinical significance 

A reciprocal translocation between chromosomes 22 and 9 produces the Philadelphia chromosome, which is often found in patients with chronic myelogenous leukemia. The chromosome 22 breakpoint for this translocation is located within the BCR gene. The translocation produces a fusion protein that is encoded by sequence from both BCR and ABL, the gene at the chromosome 9 breakpoint.

Structure 

The BCR-ABL oncoprotein oligomerisation domain found at the N-terminus of BCR is essential for the oncogenicity of the BCR-ABL fusion protein. The BCR-ABL oncoprotein oligomerisation domain consists of a short N-terminal helix (alpha-1), a flexible loop and a long C-terminal helix (alpha-2). Together these form an N-shaped structure, with the loop allowing the two helices to assume a parallel orientation. The monomeric domains associate into a dimer through the formation of an antiparallel coiled coil between the alpha-2 helices and domain swapping of two alpha-1 helices, where one alpha-1 helix swings back and packs against the alpha-2 helix from the second monomer. Two dimers then associate into a tetramer. Structure-based engineering starting from the antiparallel coiled coil domain of the BCR-ABL oncoprotein (BCR30-65) resulted in a new pH-sensitive homodimeric antiparallel coiled coil.

Interactions 

The BCR protein has been shown to interact with:

 Abl gene,
 CD117, 
 CRKL 
 FES,
 Grb2,
 GRB10,
 HCK,
 MLLT4,
 PXN,
 PIK3CG,
 PTPN6,
 PTPRT(PTPrho)
 SOS1, and
 XPB.

See also 
 Abl gene

References

Further reading

External links 
 
 
 

Genes on human chromosome 22
Protein kinases